Xerocrassa gharlapsi is a species of air-breathing land snail, a pulmonate gastropod mollusk in the family Geomitridae.

Distribution

This species is endemic to Malta.

References

 Beckmann, K.-H. (1987). Land- und Süßwassermollusken der Maltesischen Inseln. Heldia, 1 (Sonderheft 1): 1-38, pl. 1-5. München
 Bank, R. A.; Neubert, E. (2017). Checklist of the land and freshwater Gastropoda of Europe. Last update: July 16th, 2017

gharlapsi
Endemic fauna of Malta
Gastropods described in 1987